Wail, Moody, Wail is an album by saxophonist James Moody recorded in 1955 and released on the Prestige label. The CD reissue added two bonus tracks which originally appeared on James Moody's Moods.

Reception

Scott Yanow, writing for AllMusic, stated: "The bop-based group had plenty of spirit (as best shown here on the 14-minute title cut) if not necessarily a strong personality of its own... accessible, melodic and swinging".

Track listing 
 "The Golden Touch" (Quincy Jones) - 4:09  
 "The Nearness of You" (Hoagy Carmichael, Ned Washington) - 4:53  
 "The Donkey Serenade" (Rudolf Friml, Herbert Stothart) - 3:45  
 "Moody's Blue Again" (Jones) - 4:34  
 "Wail Moody, Wail" (Dave Burns, James Moody) - 13:56  
 "The Strut" (Benny Golson) - 4:02 Bonus track on CD reissue  
 "A Sinner Kissed an Angel" (Mack David, Larry Shayne) - 4:02 Bonus track on CD reissue

Personnel 
James Moody - tenor saxophone, alto saxophone
Dave Burns - trumpet
William Shepherd - trombone
Pee Wee Moore - baritone saxophone 
Jimmy Boyd - piano
John Latham - bass
Clarence Johnston - drums

Production
Bob Weinstock - supervisor
Rudy Van Gelder - engineer

References 

James Moody (saxophonist) albums
1956 albums
Prestige Records albums
Albums produced by Bob Weinstock
Albums recorded at Van Gelder Studio